Elisabeth-Sophien-Koog is a municipality in the district of Nordfriesland, in Schleswig-Holstein, Germany. It occupies a small part in the northwest of Nordstrand peninsula.

The municipality is located in and named after the polder, financed by the banker Jean Henri Desmercières and named in honour of his wife Elisabeth Sophie Desmercières.

Notable people
Peter Harry Carstensen (b. 1947), former Minister President of Schleswig-Holstein

References

Municipalities in Schleswig-Holstein
Nordfriesland
Koogs